Tsakir (Sakhir) is a rural locality (a selo) in Zakamensky District, Republic of Buryatia, Russia. The population was 846 as of 2010. There are 17 streets.

Geography 
Tsakir is located 27 km northeast of Zakamensk (the district's administrative centre) by road. Ekhe-Tsakir is the nearest rural locality.

Climate

References 

Rural localities in Zakamensky District